Political repression is the act of a state entity controlling a citizenry by force for political reasons, particularly for the purpose of restricting or preventing the citizenry's ability to take part in the political life of a society, thereby reducing their standing among their fellow citizens. Repression tactics target the citizenry who are most likely to challenge the political ideology of the state in order for the government to remain in control.  In autocracies, the use of political repression is to prevent anti-regime support and mobilization.  It is often manifested through policies such as human rights violations, surveillance abuse, police brutality, imprisonment, involuntary settlement, stripping of citizen's rights, lustration, and violent action or terror such as the murder, summary executions, torture, forced disappearance, and other extrajudicial punishment of political activists, dissidents, or general population. Direct repression tactics are those targeting specific actors who become aware of the harm done to them while covert tactics rely on the threat of citizenry being caught (wiretapping and monitoring).  The effectiveness of the tactics differ: covert repression tactics cause dissidents to use less detectable opposition tactics  while direct repression allows citizenry to witness and react to the repression.  Political repression can also be reinforced by means outside of written policy, such as by public and private media ownership and by self-censorship within the public.

Where political repression is sanctioned and organised by the state, it may constitute state terrorism, genocide, politicide or crimes against humanity. Systemic and violent political repression is a typical feature of dictatorships, totalitarian states and similar regimes. While the use of political repression varies depending on the authoritarian regime, it is argued that repression is a defining feature and the foundation of autocracies by creating a power hierarchy between the leader and citizenry, contributing to the longevity of the regime.   Repressive activities have also been found within democratic contexts as well. This can even include setting up situations where the death of the target of repression is the end result. If political repression is not carried out with the approval of the state, a section of government may still be responsible. An example are the FBI COINTELPRO operations in the United States between 1956 and 1971.

In some states, "repression" can be an official term used in legislation or the names of government institutions. The Soviet Union had a legal policy of repression of political opposition defined in its penal code and Cuba under Fulgencio Batista had a secret police agency officially named the Bureau for the Repression of Communist Activities. According to Soviet and Communist studies scholar Stephen Wheatcroft, in the case of the Soviet Union terms such as "the terror", "the purges" and "repression" are used to refer to the same events. He believes the most neutral terms are repression and mass killings, although in Russian the broad concept of repression is commonly held to include mass killings and is sometimes assumed to be synonymous with it, which is not the case in other languages.

Consequences on the State 
An example of political regime leaders facing backlash for the use of repression is in personalist dictatorships that are known for using political repression tactics.  69% of personalist dictators are exiled, imprisoned, or killed after they are no longer in power.  Additionally, by studying ten massacres, it was concluded that the use of serious, atrocious repression is not a productive political control tactic for a leader as it will push citizenry to mobilize against the regime whether it be an immediate or future consequence.  For example, after political repression in the 2018 Zimbabwe elections, surveys showed short-term citizenry opposition,   while anti-regime attitudes decades after China’s Cultural Revolution are high in citizens that were exposed to the repression as children. 

Acts of political repression may be carried out by secret police forces, army, paramilitary groups or death squads. Because political repression often requires the leader to use other actors, the leader must provide the actors with the necessary means to do so.  In such a case, the actors are capable of turning against the leader, using the provided resources to take action.  Additionally, if the leader becomes heavily reliant on the military as actors, there are two consequences: (1) the military can gain power as they are able to threaten the leader into backing certain policies  and (2) if the leader is no longer able to provide the resources for the actors, repression halts and the regime is at risk of a takeover.

In political conflict 
Political conflict strongly increases the likelihood of state repression. This is arguably the most robust finding in social science research on political repression. Civil wars are a strong predictor of repressive activity, as are other forms of challenges from non-government actors. States so often engage in repressive behaviors in times of civil conflict that the relationship between these two phenomena has been termed the "Law of Coercive Responsiveness". When their authority or legitimacy is threatened, regimes respond by overtly or covertly suppressing dissidents to eliminate the behavioral threat. State repression subsequently affects dissident mobilization, though the direction of this effect is still an open question. Some strong evidence suggests that repression suppresses dissident mobilization by reducing the capacity of challengers to organize, yet it is also feasible that challengers can leverage state repressive behavior to spur mobilization among sympathizers by framing repression as a new grievance against the state.

Violence 

Political repression is often accompanied by violence, which might be legal or illegal according to domestic law.  Violence can both eliminate political opposition directly by killing opposition members, or indirectly by instilling fear.

Intolerance 
Political repression is sometimes accompanied with intolerance. This intolerance is manifested through discriminatory policies, human rights violations, police brutality, imprisonment, extermination, exile, extortion, terrorism, extrajudicial killing, summary execution, torture, forced disappearance and other punishments against political activists, dissidents, and population in general.

State terrorism 
When political repression is sanctioned and organized by the state, situations of state terrorism, genocide and crimes against humanity can be reached. Systematic and violent political repression is a typical feature of dictatorships, totalitarianisms and similar regimes. In these regimes, acts of political repression can be carried out by the police and secret police, the army, paramilitary groups and death squads. Sometimes regimes considered democratic exercise political repression and state terrorism to other states as part of their security policy.  Both democratic and autocratic nations have been using the possession of nuclear weapons as a form of state terrorism directed at other countries. In this instance of indirect repression, there is a threat of violence if states do not comply with other states desires. The Cuban Missile Crisis of 1962 is an example of these forms of repression at work.

Direct vs. Indirect Repression 
Direct repression is a form of repression where the state targets an opposing political actor by obvious violent action. The target is clearly aware of the harm that is caused to their life and livelihood. Direct repression does not exclusively occur within the boundaries of a state, but also across borders. In personalist dictatorships, initiating conflicts with other states and people outside their own borders is more common because of lack of accountability via extremely limited or no competitive elections. 

Indirect repression relies on the threat of violence which constitutes harassment, intimidation, and administrative blockages. These tactics tend to be non-violent, yet still are built to control citizenry.

Cost of Repression 
Repression is a double-edged sword for dictators because they are frequently required to allot power to the military. While repression can keep the masses under control, the military may be able to revolt against the dictator when it is given too much power. During the Arab Spring, political oppression, economic inequality, and corruption caused the masses to revolt and proved some Arab nations’ vulnerabilities to military defection.

State repression sometimes leads to backlash mobilization and an increase in anti-regime attitudes that persist for decades. Those who are exposed to violent repression carry stronger anti-regime attitudes and pass the sentiment onto the next generation. Children whose parents were exposed to more violence during China's Cultural Revolution have stronger anti-regime attitudes today.

Repressive Success and Monitoring 
Individuals indirectly exposed to repression self-report higher trust in the leader and ruling party. This phenomenon was observed in Zimbabwe under Robert Mugabe, where the effects of repression increased approaching elections, even with deteriorating social and economic conditions. A large signifier of whether or not repression is successful in a state is evidence of preference falsification– where the preference expressed by an individual in public diverges from their private preference. In North Korea, accused of highly repressive activity in media and public culture, 100% of citizens vote in ‘no choice’ parliamentary elections so the state can identify defectors. Citizens are required to show complete devotion to North Korea's current leader and sacrifice their safety if they choose to speak out. Repressive measures including prison camps, torture, forced labor, and threats of execution are just some of the costs of defection.

See also 
 Anti-communist mass killings
 Authoritarianism
 Autocracy
 Crimes against humanity under communist regimes
 Dictatorship
 Mass killings under communist regimes
 Police state
 Politicide
 Political prisoner
 Political violence
 Preventive repression
 Religious persecution
 Restrictions on political parties
 State terrorism
 1989 Tiananmen Square protests and massacre
 Totalitarianism

References

Further reading 
 Articles
 Understanding Covert Repressive Action: The Case of the U.S. Government against the Republic of New Africa (186kb PDF file) by Christian Davenport, Professor, University of Maryland.
 State Repression and Political Order by Christian Davenport, Professor, University of Maryland.
 Journals
 Special issue of Interface: a journal for and about social movements on repression and social movements.
 Books
 Davenport, Christian; Appel, Benjamin (2022). The Death and Life of State Repression: Understanding Onset, Escalation, Termination, and Recurrence. Oxford University Press.
 Goldstein, Robert Justin, Political Repression in Modern America (University of Illinois Press, 1978, 2001) .
 Jensen, Joan M. Army Surveillance in America, 1775 - 1980. New Haven. Yale University Press. 1991. .
 Talbert Jr. Roy. Negative Intelligence: The Army and the American Left, 1917 - 1941. Jackson. University Press of Mississippi, 1991. .
 Irvin, Cynthia L. Militant Nationalism between movement and party in Ireland and the Basque Country. University of Minnesota Press, 1999.
Seigel, Micol. 2018. Violence Work: State Power and the Limits of Police. Duke University Press.

Comparative politics
 
Human rights abuses
Persecution